The highland copperhead (Austrelaps ramsayi), also known as Ramsay's copperhead, is a species of venomous snake in the family Elapidae endemic to Australia.

Taxonomy
Gerard Krefft described the highland copperhead in 1864 as Hoplocephalus ramsayi from a specimen collected in Braidwood, New South Wales. The specific name, ramsayi, is in honour of Edward Pierson Ramsay, who was an Australian ornithologist, herpetologist, and who collected the holotype specimen.

Description
A. ramsayi has an average total length (including tail) of 113 cm (44 inches). It can vary in upper (dorsal) colour from mid to very dark brown with a creamy yellow belly tinged with red between the differing colours.

Distribution and habitat
The highlands copperhead inhabits the Alpine regions of eastern Australia, and is common in the Southern Highlands of NSW, including Mittagong, Bowral and Moss Vale.

A. ramsayi is found in montane heath, woodland, sclerophyll forests, along water bodies, and in swampy areas with thick clumps of tussock grass.

Reproduction
Austrelaps ramsayi is ovoviviparous, with between 9 and 31 young per brood.

References

Further reading
Boulenger GA (1896). Catalogue of the Snakes in the British Museum (Natural History). Volume III. Containing the Colubridæ (Opisthoglyphæ and Proteroglyphæ) ... London: Trustees of the British Museum (Natural History). (Taylor and Francis, printers). xiv + 727 pp. + Plates I-XXV. (Denisonia ramsayi, new combination, p. 338).
Cogger HG (2014). Reptiles and Amphibians of Australia, Seventh Edition. Clayton, Victoria, Australia: CSIRO Publishing. xxx + 1,033 pp. .
Rawlinson, Peter Alan (1991). "Taxonomy and distribution of the Australian tiger snakes (Notechis) and copperheads (Austrelaps) (Serpentes, Elapidae)". Proc. Royal Soc. Victoria 103 (2): 125–135. (Austrelaps ramsayi, new combination).
Wilson, Steve; Swan, Gerry (2013). A Complete Guide to Reptiles of Australia, Fourth Edition. Sydney: New Holland Publishers. 522 pp. .

Austrelaps
Snakes of Australia
Reptiles of New South Wales
Reptiles of Victoria (Australia)
Endemic fauna of Australia
Taxa named by Gerard Krefft
Reptiles described in 1864